Furir (from French fourrier, a person responsible for the feed) is a Swedish military rank (OR5) reintroduced in 2019, after having been abolished in 2009.

Duties
The Furir is a Squad Leader at Skill Level B (Intermediate). Promotion from Korpral to Furir requires a minimum time-in-grade of one year.

History
The responsibility of a Furir was to arrange for housing as well as the distribution of food in a Company. French court artist Jean Perréal was "fourrier" to Charlotte de Savoy and her daughter Anne, as well as to Margret of Austria, daughter of emperor Maximilian I. The rank became the lowest non-commissioned officer rank in 1833. Holders of the rank Furir were elevated to Sergeant and the rank was abolished in 1875. In 1915 the rank was reintroduced as a rank for senior squad leaders and instructors. The rank was abolished in 2009 and reintroduced ten years later.

Earlier rank insignia

See also
Överfurir

References

Military ranks of the Swedish Army